Jordan Djounorou Sakho (born 4 April 1997) is a Congolese professional basketball player for UCAM Murcia CB.

Personal
Sakho is of Malian descent.

National team career
As a member of the DR Congo national team, he won the AfroCan 2019.

References

External links
FIBA profile
Eurobasket.com Profile

1997 births
Living people
Basketball players from Kinshasa
Centers (basketball)
Democratic Republic of the Congo expatriate basketball people in Spain
Democratic Republic of the Congo men's basketball players
Democratic Republic of the Congo people of Malian descent
CB Murcia players
CB Miraflores players
CB Breogán players